Patrik Karl Erik Magnusson (born 1969) is a Swedish genetic epidemiologist and senior researcher at the Karolinska Institute, where he leads the Swedish Twin Registry. He was listed as an ISI Highly Cited Researcher in 2017.

References

External links
Faculty page

Living people
1969 births
Academic staff of the Karolinska Institute
Swedish geneticists
Swedish epidemiologists
Genetic epidemiologists
Uppsala University alumni